Peepeekisis 81 is an Indian reserve of the Peepeekisis Cree Nation in Saskatchewan. It is 14 kilometres east of Fort Qu'Appelle. In the 2016 Canadian Census, it recorded a population of 491 living in 135 of its 146 total private dwellings. In the same year, its Community Well-Being index was calculated at 53 of 100, compared to 58.4 for the average First Nations community and 77.5 for the average non-Indigenous community.

References

Indian reserves in Saskatchewan
Division No. 6, Saskatchewan
Peepeekisis Cree Nation